Winter X Games XXVII was held from 27 to 30 January 2023 in Aspen, Colorado, United States. This is the 22nd consecutive Winter X Games held in Aspen. The event was broadcast on ESPN.

Participating athletes compete in eight skiing events and eight snowboarding events.

Medal table

Medal summary

Snowboard

Ski

Ref

References

External links
 
 X Games Aspen official website
 All results and medals complete list

XXVI
2023 in winter sports
2023 in American sports
2023 in sports in Colorado
Winter multi-sport events in the United States
Skiing competitions in the United States
ESPN
January 2023 sports events in the United States